Corimbion is a genus of beetles in the family Cerambycidae, containing the following species:

 Corimbion antennatum Martins & Galileo, 2014
Corimbion balteum Martins, 1970
 Corimbion caliginosum Martins, 1970
Corimbion kuckartzi Santos-Silva, Galileo & Wappes, 2015
Corimbion ledezmae Santos-Silva, Galileo & Wappes, 2015
 Corimbion martinsi Giesbert, 1998
Corimbion mutabile Bezark, Santos-Silva & Galileo, 2016
 Corimbion nigroapicatum Martins, 1970
 Corimbion supremum Martins, 1970
 Corimbion terminatum Martins, 1970
 Corimbion vulgare Martins, 1970

References

Ibidionini